Gästrike-Hälsinge Nation, colloquially known as GH, is an association of university students in Uppsala, Sweden, primarily from Uppsala University but also for students from the Swedish University of Agricultural Sciences. The nation first and foremost, but not exclusively, recruits students from the Hälsingland and Gästrikland provinces of Sweden.

Inspektors 
 Gästrike nation

 Hälsinge nation

 Gästrike-Hälsinge nation

Nations at Uppsala University
Student organizations established in the 17th century
1646 establishments in Sweden